The Lisco State Aid Bridge is located on a county road over the North Platte River south of Lisco, Nebraska. Completed in 1928, the bridge today "is distinguished as an important crossing of the Platte River and one of the last two intact multiple-span state aid truss bridges" in Nebraska.

History
The Nebraska Department of Public Works contracted Western Bridge and Construction Company to begin construction on the Lisco Bridge in October 1927, several months after the company completed the nearby Lewellen State Aid Bridge. Built for $47,600, Western used steel fabricated by the Inland Steel Corporation and completed the project over the winter season. Originally part of the U.S. 6 highway system, the Lisco Bridge now carries a county road.

See also
 Platte River
 List of historic bridges in Nebraska

References

Buildings and structures in Garden County, Nebraska
Bridges completed in 1928
Truss bridges in the United States
Road bridges on the National Register of Historic Places in Nebraska
1928 establishments in Nebraska
National Register of Historic Places in Garden County, Nebraska
Steel bridges in the United States